Statistics of the Turkish First Football League for the 1967–68 season.

Overview
It was contested by 17 teams, and Fenerbahçe S.K. won the championship.

League table

Results

References
Turkey - List of final tables (RSSSF)

Süper Lig seasons
1967–68 in Turkish football
Turkey